Sarasinula marginata is a species of air-breathing land slug, a terrestrial pulmonate gastropod mollusk in the family Veronicellidae, the leatherleaf slugs.

Description 
Sarasinula marginata is superficially very similar to Sarasinula plebeia, however it can be distinguished from that species by minor differences in the male genitalia.

Distribution
Sarasinula marginata is found in countries and islands including:

 Dominica. First reported in 2009.
 Guadeloupe
 Brazil, (Paraiba to Rio Grande do Sul)
 Peru
 Colombia

Ecology 
This species was found in a dasheen (Colocasia esculenta) field in the Caribbean island of Dominica. It appears to be a minor pest in the agriculture of Dominica.

References
This article incorporates CC-BY-3.0 text from the reference.

Veronicellidae
Gastropods described in 1885